

Historical or architectural interest bridges

Major bridges 

Alphabetical list

Flyovers and Overpasses

See also 

 Transport in Bangladesh
 Rail transport in Bangladesh
 List of roads in Bangladesh
 Geography of Bangladesh
 List of rivers of Bangladesh

References 
 Notes

 Nicolas Janberg, Structurae.com, International Database for Civil and Structural Engineering

 Others references

Further reading

External links 

Bangladesh

Bridges
b